Keytaon Kaylen Thompson (born October 23, 1998) is an American football wide receiver for the Virginia Cavaliers. He previously played quarterback at Mississippi State.

High school career
Thompson attended L.B. Landry College and Career Preparatory High School in New Orleans, Louisiana. He played quarterback in high school. As a senior, he was the Gatorade Football Player of the Year for Louisiana after passing for 3,825 yards with 46 touchdowns and 1,434 rushing yards with 26 touchdowns. For his career, Thompson had 10,737 yards of total offense and 149 total touchdowns. He committed to Mississippi State University to play college football.

College career
Thompson played quarterback at Mississippi State from 2017 to 2019. As a true freshman in 2017, he spent the year as a backup to Nick Fitzgerald. He made his first career start in the 2017 TaxSlayer Bowl in place of an injured Fitzgerald. He led the team to victory against Louisville, completing 11 of 20 passes for 127 and rushing for 147 yards with three touchdowns. He played in nine games as a backup to Fitzgerald in 2018 and made one start. In 2019, he played in one game and took a redshirt.

Thompson transferred to the University of Virginia in 2020. He played wide receiver at Virginia. In nine games in 2020, he had seven receptions for 98 yards and three touchdowns. In 2021, Thompson started 10 of 12 games and led the team with 78 receptions for 990 yards and two touchdowns.

References

External links
Virginia Cavaliers bio

1998 births
Living people
Players of American football from New Orleans
American football wide receivers
American football quarterbacks
Mississippi State Bulldogs football players
Virginia Cavaliers football players